A swazzle (swozzle, schwazzle or swatchel) is a device made of two strips of metal bound around a cotton tape reed. The device is used to produce the distinctive harsh, rasping voice of Punch in a Punch and Judy show, and is held in the mouth by the professor (performer).

The design of the swazzle was once a secret guarded by the professors and only taught to those with a genuine respect for and interest in learning the performance of Punch and Judy puppetry. The device can now be bought from joke and magic shops although those made according to the traditional design are smaller and are generally considered superior.

The swazzle must be soaked in liquor, beer, water, or saliva before use. The swazzle is positioned between the tongue and the roof of the mouth so that exhaled air passes between the two metal strips, causing the reed to vibrate and shake. Deft movements of the tongue allow the professor to move the swazzle in and out of position, allowing them to switch between voices.

Swallowing

Because the swazzle is small, positioned in the back of the mouth and must be repeatedly moved during a performance, there is a risk that it may be swallowed while in use. In order to minimise the risk of swallowing, some professors attach a length of cotton thread to their swazzle so that it can be pulled back if it slips into the throat. In series 3, episode 11 of the British panel show QI, presenter Stephen Fry said that a Punch and Judy performer must accidentally swallow a swazzle at least twice before they can be considered a "professor".

See also

Eunuch flute
Kazoo

External links
Punch's Swazzle: Construction at Punch & Judy: The Punch Page
Making a Swazzle at Punch and Judy on the Web
The Punch's Swazzle

Membranophones
Puppetry